The Crooked Sky is a low budget 1957 black and white British melodrama/crime film, directed by Henry Cass from a story by Maclean Rogers and Charles F. Vetter. The film stars Wayne Morris, Anton Diffring and Karin Booth.

Plot
American detective Mike Conlin (Wayne Morris), teams up with Scotland Yard to catch the villains behind a big counterfeiting ring. After the mysterious death of an American airline radio operator, the Yard suspect the operation may originate in the United States, and Conlin is brought over to help.

In London, £500,000 in counterfeit one-pound notes has been smuggled in by Tom Alanson (Guy Kingsley-Poynter), an American radio engineer for a freight line flying between England and the United States. He is in a gang of smugglers but goes to Scotland Yard but two gang members stab him to death. Yard Inspector "Mac" MacAuley (Bruce Seton) believes the forged notes come from the United States. Mac contacts the U.S. Treasury who assigns investigator Mike Conlin (Wayne Morris) to the case.

Mike suspects Alanson's freight line were involved in smuggling the counterfeit currency, subsequently, he flies to London. Mike posing as an efficiency expert, he meets radio engineer Sandra Hastings (Karin Booth), Alanson's fiancée, and sister of Bill Hastings (Sheldon Lawrence), another radio operator.

While searching woods near company headquarters, Mike witnesses the fatal shooting of another company employee. After revealing his true identity to the local police inspector, who has come to investigate the murder, Mike goes to London to consult with Mac and suggests that the fake currency might have been concealed in radio equipment removed after each flight. Later, at an illegal gambling club in London, Bill introduces Sandra to Frank Fraser (Anton Diffring), the club's operator and, unknown to her, the head of the counterfeit ring.

In private, Bill, whose involvement in the ring was to earn money to start his own charter company, tells Fraser he is concerned about the recent murders. After a gambler named Smith (Reginald Hearne), heavy in debt to Fraser, commits suicide, some counterfeit notes are found, along with a list of gambling clubs. The police begin to investigate Fraser while Mike continues to look for evidence.

Eventually, Bill warns Fraser about the new man, leading Fraser to assign two thugs to follow Mike. Sandra accuses Bill of being involved with Fraser's criminal activities. She also tells Mike about Fraser. Breaking intoFraser's house, Mike finds counterfeit pound notes in a desk drawer. Surprised by Fraser and his henchmen, Mike is taken to a wooded area to kill him, but Mike escapes.

When Fraser's girl friend, Penny (Colette Bartrop), takes several bundles of counterfeit notes to buy an expensive necklace, the money is traced back to Fraser. With Mac's help, Mike makes plans to round up the entire gang, and when Bill returns from the U.S., has him followed to Fraser's house. After Bill informs Fraser that the notes are still on the aircraft, Fraser is tipped off by one of his thugs that a police raid is imminent.

At gunpoint, Fraser orders Bill to take him to the air base and fly him out of the country. Upon learning that Bill did not take the notes to Fraser, Mike boards the aircraft to search for them. When Fraser and Bill arrive at the aircraft, Fraser shoots Mike in the shoulder, then orders Bill to fly to France, although Bill warns him that all airports will be closed to them.

Strapping on a parachute, in which the gang has been smuggling the currency, Fraser plans to jump from the aircraft and escape, unaware that the parachute has been altered to accommodate more counterfeit notes. Bill puts the aircraft on automatic pilot, attacks Fraser who falls out of the aircraft, but his parachute fails to open and Fraser plummets to his death.

Back on the ground, Mike assures Sandra and Bill that, due to Bill's actions in the air that day, it is unlikely that he will be prosecuted.

Cast

Wayne Morris as Mike Conlin
Karin Booth as Sandra Hastings
Anton Diffring as Frank Fraser
Bruce Seton as "Mac" MacAuley
Sheldon Lawrence as Bill Hastings
Richard Shaw as Williams
Colette Bartrop as Penny 
Seymour Green as Steve
Bill Brandon as Grange
Reginald Hearne as Smith
Frank Hawkins as Robson
Murray Kash as Lewis
Wally Peterson as Wilson
Guy Kingsley-Poynter as Tom Alanson
Robert Raglan as Senior Civil Servant
Robert Perceval as U.S. Treasury Official
Beryl Cooke as Landlady
Robert Hunter as Manager
Frank Henderson as Salesman
George Roderick as Inspector Hughes
Jack Taylor as Croupier
Howard Lang as Commissioner

Production
The Crooked Sky began principal photography on 13 August 1956 at Merton Park Studios in London. Location shots were at Blackbushe Airport.

The original cast included Tim Conway in the lead male role, who was replaced by Wayne Morris after Conway became ill.
The aircraft in The Crooked Sky were:
 Avro York
 Douglas C-47 Skytrain c/n 33285/1653, s/n 44-76953, code ZU-13
 Douglas Dakota
 Handley Page Hermes
 Percival P-50 Prince c/n 46, G-AMLZ
 Percival Proctor
 Vickers Viking1B c/n 146, G-AIH

Reception
David Wright in his review for the Avelyman.com website thought The Crooked Sky "has a few neat moments, but is pretty much filler" ; while TV Guide called The Crooked Sky an "interesting British attempt to put an American-style, hard-boiled detective in their own yard, (it) even goes as far as naming the hero "Mike" instead of the usual "Geoffrey" or "Ronnie."

Notes

References

Bibliography
 Maltin, Leonard. Leonard Maltin's Movie Encyclopedia. New York: Penquin Books, 1994. .
 Weaver, Tom.The Horror Hits of Richard Gordon. Albany, Georgia: Bear Manor Media, 2011. .

External links
 
 
 
 

1957 films
1957 drama films
British drama films
Films with screenplays by Norman Hudis
Films directed by Henry Cass
British aviation films
Films set in London
1950s English-language films
Merton Park Studios films
1950s British films